Whitney is an American television sitcom starring and created by Whitney Cummings for NBC, who also serves as one of the writers and executive producers. The program ran in the United States from September 22, 2011 to March 27, 2013. The series follows Cummings as an opinionated self-employed photographer and her live-in boyfriend of three years as they deal with trying to keep their relationship growing even if they're not married, with help from their friends.

Series overview

Episodes

Season 1 (2011–12) 

<li> The first episode was available via NBC.com/NBC On-Demand on September 15. The second was available via Yahoo! on September 27.

Season 2 (2012–13)

References

External links 
 
 

Lists of American sitcom episodes
2011 American television seasons
2012 American television seasons
2013 American television seasons